Otlum is a 2018 Philippine horror film starring Buboy Villar, Jerome Ponce, Ricci Rivero, Vitto Marquez and Danzel Fernandez, directed and written by Joven Tan. It is one of the official entries of the 2018 Metro Manila Film Festival.

The term "Otlum" is "Multo" spelled backward,  which means "Ghost".

Story 
The film is about a group of teenagers being haunted by a ghost who committed suicide in a haunted orphanage.

Cast 
 Buboy Villar as Fred
 Jerome Ponce as Allan
 Ricci Rivero as Dindo
 Vitto Marquez as Erwin
 Danzel Fernandez as Caloy
 Kiray Celis as Jessa
 Michelle Vito as Verna
 John Estrada as Bien
 Irma Adlawan as Aling Gemma
 Pen Medina as Father Resty
 Alfonso Yñigo Delen as young ghost
 Jairus Aquino as Buloy
 Vivoree Esclito as Girl Recruit
 Ping Medina as young Father Resty

Production 
The film was directed and written by Joven Tan and it was produced by Horseshoe Studios. Tan described Otlum as being similar to films of the Shake, Rattle and Roll franchise, which the director said he enjoyed watching growing up.

Release
Otlum was released in cinemas in the Philippines on December 25, 2018, as part of the 2018 Metro Manila Film Festival. The film marks as Joven Tan's directorial debut in the film festival, as well as the film acting debut of Ricci Rivero, who was more noted for being a basketball player. Otlum'''s selection as among the eight entries was met with some controversy after the MMFF executive committee chose the film over Alpha: The Right To Kill''. In response to the controversy, co-lead Rivero dismissed criticism on the film's selection remarking that he could not "control others' opinions".

References

External links 

 

Philippine horror films
2018 horror thriller films
Films directed by Joven Tan